The Sick's Sense is the sixth studio album by German gothic metal band End of Green.

Personnel 

 Michelle Darkness – vocals/guitar
 Kirk Kirker – guitar
 Sad Sir – guitar
 Rainer Sicone Di Hampez – bass
 Lusiffer – drums

Track listing

Reception 
Metal1.info reviewed the album positively, giving it a 10/10. However, Benjamin Foitzik only found it to be average.

References 

 

2008 albums
End of Green (band) albums